Solomon Weathersbee Downs (1801August 14, 1854) was an American attorney and politician from Louisiana. A Democrat, he was most notable for his service as a United States senator from 1847 to 1853.

Early life
Downs was born in Montgomery County, Tennessee in 1801, the illegitimate son of William Weathersbee and Rebecca Downs. His family later moved to Louisiana, and sent Downs back to Tennessee to study under tutor Thomas B. Craighead. He then attended Transylvania University in Lexington, Kentucky, from which he graduated in 1823. He studied law, was admitted to the bar in 1826 and commenced practice in Bayou Sara, Louisiana. He later moved to Ouachita, where he practiced law and owned and operated a plantation.

Career
A Democrat, he became active in politics as a campaign speaker on behalf of Andrew Jackson in 1828. In 1838, he won election to the Louisiana State Senate from Catahoula, Ouachita and Union Parishes, and he was reelected in 1842.

A longtime member of the Louisiana Militia, in 1842 Downs was appointed brigadier general of the organization's 6th Division.

In 1844 he was a delegate to the state constitutional convention. Also in 1844, he agreed to run for presidential elector as a supporter of Martin Van Buren. When Van Buren came out against annexing Texas, Downs resigned, but he agreed to run again after James K. Polk was nominated. Polk won the election and carried Louisiana, and Downs cast his ballot for the ticket of Polk for president and George M. Dallas for vice president.

Downs moved to New Orleans in 1845. He served as United States Attorney for the district of Louisiana from 1845 to 1846 and a member of the State constitutional convention.

He was elected as a Democrat to the U.S. Senate and served from March 4, 1847 to March 3, 1853. While in the Senate he was chairman of the Committee on Engrossed Bills (Thirtieth Congress) and the Committee on Private Land Claims (Thirtieth through Thirty-second Congresses).

He was appointed by President Franklin Pierce as United States Collector of Customs for the District of Orleans in 1853 and he served until his death.

Death and burial
Downs died in Crab Orchard Springs, Lincoln County, Kentucky on August 14, 1854 and was buried on his family's plantation in Kentucky. He was later reburied at Riverview Sanitarium in Monroe, Louisiana, and the burial ground there became Riverview Cemetery. Under the terms of his will, Downs freed a slave, Richard Barrington, who had been taught to read and write while living on Downs' plantation. Barrington later became a successful barber in New Orleans, and learned that Downs' grave had not been marked, so Barrington paid for a headstone. Downs' grave was later lost, and was uncovered again in 1937. After being moved to a spot near the cemetery entrance, the grave was forgotten about a second time. It was rediscovered in 2000, and is marked by the broken pieces of the headstone originally purchased by Barrington.

Family
In 1830, Downs married Ann Marie McCaleb (d. 1857). They were the parents of two children, Samuel Alfred Downs and Sarah Mary Downs.

References

External links

1801 births
1854 deaths
United States Attorneys for the District of Louisiana
Louisiana Democrats
Louisiana lawyers
Farmers from Louisiana
Transylvania University alumni
American planters
People from Montgomery County, Tennessee
Democratic Party United States senators from Louisiana
19th-century American politicians
People from St. Francisville, Louisiana
19th-century American lawyers